Federal Criminal Police Office, or Bundeskriminalamt (a German language compound noun literally meaning "Federal Criminal Office"), can refer to:

Federal Criminal Police Office (Germany)
Federal Criminal Police Office (Austria)